Federico Alberto Cuello Camilo (Santo Domingo, 1966) is a diplomat of the Dominican Republic. He is the new Ambassador Extraordinary and Plenipotentiary to the State of Qatar.

References

"Federico Cuello Camilo Sworn In as Permanent Ambassador to the United Nations", Dominicana Online, 2009-05-11

"RD y Reino Unido acuerdan negociar una alianza estratégica". Listin Diario, 2012-01-22

ent
|-

1966 births
Living people
People from Santo Domingo
Dominican Republic people of Spanish descent
Dominican Republic diplomats
Ambassadors of the Dominican Republic to Qatar
Ambassadors of the Dominican Republic to the United Kingdom
Ambassadors of the Dominican Republic to the European Union
Ambassadors of the Dominican Republic to Belgium
Ambassadors of the Dominican Republic to Poland
Ambassadors of the Dominican Republic to the Czech Republic
Permanent Representatives of the Dominican Republic to the United Nations
Permanent Representatives of the Dominican Republic to the World Trade Organization
University of Illinois alumni
Academic staff of the Pontificia Universidad Católica Madre y Maestra
Santo Domingo Institute of Technology alumni